Essex Junction is a city in Chittenden County, Vermont, United States. As of the 2020 U.S. census, the population was 10,590.  It was incorporated as a village on November 15, 1892. Essex Junction became Vermont’s 10th city on July 1, 2022.

Amtrak, the national passenger rail system, provides daily service via its station in Essex Junction, one of two rail stations in Chittenden County and the state of Vermont's busiest Amtrak station. It was also the nearest Amtrak station to Burlington until the Ethan Allen Express was extended to serve the city directly on July 29, 2022. The Vermonter train runs daily from the Franklin County seat of St. Albans to Union Station in Washington, D.C. It was formerly called the Montrealer; its terminus being at Central Station in Montreal, Quebec, Canada.

The City of Essex Junction is part of the Essex Westford Unified Union School District. Operating K-12 schools including Essex High School.

Essex Junction is home to GlobalFoundries' Burlington Design Center and 200 mm wafer fabrication plant. GlobalFoundries is the largest private employer in the state of Vermont, with approximately 3,000 employees.

History

IBM and GlobalFoundries
The village history was affected in a major way by the presence of IBM (now GlobalFoundries), which chose Essex Junction as the site for its facility in 1958.

In 1958, IBM leased a  facility in the southeast part of the village for its new Data Processing Division. By the end of the year, there were 500 workers.

In 1982, employment reached an all-time high of 8,000. In 2007, the town listers dropped the value of the plant from a high of $147.5 million to $104 million. The plant's workforce was a little over 5,000 in 2011. As a GlobalFoundries operation since July 2015, the plant retains about 3,000 employees.

Cyberbullying
In 2003, as a result of the nationally publicized suicide of an Essex Junction teenager, Vermont and other states passed legislation against cyberbullying.

Separation from town of Essex 
On November 2, 2021, voters in the village of Essex Junction voted overwhelmingly to separate from the town of Essex, citing an unfair tax burden. The vote was 3,070-411 in favor of separation.

Geography
Essex Junction is located southwest of Essex and is bordered on the south by the Winooski River.

Climate
This climatic region is typified by large seasonal temperature differences, with warm to hot summers and cold winters.  According to the Köppen Climate Classification system, Essex Junction has a humid continental climate, abbreviated "Dfb" on climate maps.

Demographics

As of the census of 2000, there were 8,591 people, 3,409 households, and 2,253 families residing in the city.  The population density was 1,804.1 people per square mile (696.8/km2).  There were 3,501 housing units at an average density of 735.2/sq mi (284.0/km2). There were 3,409 households, out of which 35.1% had children under the age of 18 living with them, 53.4% were married couples living together, 9.8% had a female householder with no husband present, and 33.9% were non-families. 26.4% of all households were made up of individuals, and 7.4% had someone living alone who was 65 years of age or older.  The average household size was 2.48 and the average family size was 3.04.

In the city, the population was spread out, with 26.4% under the age of 18, 7.7% from 18 to 24, 32.9% from 25 to 44, 23.1% from 45 to 64, and 10.0% who were 65 years of age or older.  The median age was 36 years. For every 100 females, there were 97.6 males.  For every 100 females age 18 and over, there were 96.0 males.

Economy

Personal income
The median income for a household in the city was $53,444, and the median income for a family was $61,985. Males had a median income of $40,287 versus $26,910 for females. The per capita income for the city was $24,142.  About 1.8% of families and 2.9% of the population were below the poverty line, including 2.6% of those under age 18 and 7.8% of those age 65 or over.

Industry
The largest industrial facility in Vermont is GlobalFoundries' semiconductor plant in Essex Junction. In 2007, the then-IBM plant had the largest assessment in the town, $104 million.

Champlain Valley Exposition
Essex Junction is home to the Champlain Valley Exposition, a former dirt racetrack that has evolved into a large event field, with stadium seating for concerts, and multiple halls that can host a variety of indoor events.

Champlain Valley Fair
The 10-day Champlain Valley Fair is the most notable event held at the Expo. The state's largest fair consists of five components blended together at the same time:
 A large agricultural exhibit with a dairy cows, other farm animals, and 4-H-style events for both livestock and agriculture.
 A commercial exhibit for a variety of local and regional vendors, including Rocky's Pizza and Halvorson's Roadhouse to showcase their products to the public.
 A large area dedicated to a mix of local foods like real maple syrup, and conventional fair foods such as fried dough and cotton candy.
 A midway provided by Strates Shows with rides typical of a large traveling carnival. 
 Nightly concerts, which in 2010 included Lyle Lovett, Keith Urban, and Justin Bieber.
The Fair was cancelled in 2020 due to Covid-19 restrictions.  The headliner for the Fair Darius Rucker will return to the Fair in 2021.

Over the last decade, total fair attendance has been almost 300,000 per year. In 2010, the fair had 46 carnival rides and almost 200 vendors.

Other Expo events
Other events held at the Champlain Valley Expo include an Antique Car Show, WOKO Giant Flea Market, Nightmare Vermont, Vermont International Festival, and the Champlain Valley Balloon Festival.

Government

The Village of Essex Junction was formed within the town of Essex on November 15, 1892. The village was formed to provide services (such as sidewalks, water, and sewers) to the villagers that the rest of the mostly rural town did not want, and did not want to pay for.

As the town outside the village developed, it added similar services. By 1958, the first hints of merger showed up in a voter petition. Since then a series of votes (often contentious) had defeated or passed merger in each community, but never at the same time in both. The state legislature required a positive vote in both.

This temporarily changed on 2006-11-07 when merger passed in the town as a whole, and in the village. Everyone in the town voted on the merger; the villagers voted in a second ballot on the merger if it passed the townwide vote. The large regional paper initially misreported the results as a defeat of the merger, based solely on the vote results outside the village.  The next day the correct results were reported in both the town's paper, and as a correction in the regional paper.

On December 6, 2006, a petition to reconsider the merger was submitted to the Town. The petition contained signatures totaling more than 5 percent of registered voters, which is the threshold required to force a re-vote.  The revote was held on 2007-01-23 with a result that overturned merger by 191 votes, rejecting the current merger proposal.

In late 2020 and early 2021 merger discussions took place again, and a new charter for a merger between the Town of Essex outside the Village and the Village of Essex Junction was voted down in March 2021. 

On November 2, 2021, Essex Junction voted heavily in favor of secession from the Town of Essex, forming a new city. The referendum requires approval by the Vermont State Legislature in order to take effect.

On July 1, 2022, the Village of Essex Junction became the City of Essex Junction.

Education
The Essex Westford School District was consolidated in 2017.   The district includes and funds schools in Essex Junction, Essex Town, and Westford.  The schools in Essex Junction include Essex High School, Summit Street School (K-3), Thomas Fleming School (4-5), Albert D. Lawton School (6-9), the Hiawatha School(K-3), and the Center for Technology Essex.

Notable people 

 Guy W. Bailey, Secretary of State of Vermont and University of Vermont president
 Season Hubley, actress
 Dewey H. Perry, U.S. Marshal for Vermont
 Loung Ung, author
 Brian Wood, comic book author and screenwriter

See also
Essex Junction (Amtrak station)

References

External links
Village of Essex Junction official website

 
Cities in Vermont
e
Burlington, Vermont metropolitan area
Cities in Chittenden County, Vermont